Atypical ductal hyperplasia (ADH) is the term used for a benign lesion of the breast that indicates an increased risk of breast cancer.

The name of the entity is descriptive of the lesion; ADH is characterized by cellular proliferation (hyperplasia) within one or two breast ducts and (histomorphologic) architectural abnormalities, i.e. the cells are arranged in an abnormal or atypical way.

In the context of a core (needle) biopsy, ADH is considered an indication for a breast lumpectomy, also known as a surgical (excisional) biopsy, to exclude the presence of breast cancer.

Signs and symptoms
ADH, generally, is asymptomatic.  It usually comes to medical attention on a screening mammogram, as a non-specific suspicious abnormality that requires a biopsy.

Pathology

ADH, cytologically, architecturally and on a molecular basis, is identical to a low-grade ductal carcinoma in situ (DCIS); however, it has a limited extent, i.e. is present in a very small amount (< 2 mm).

Relation to low-grade ductal carcinoma in situ

While the histopathologic features and molecular features of ADH are that of (low-grade) DCIS, its clinical behaviour, unlike low-grade DCIS, is substantially better; thus, the more aggressive treatment for DCIS is not justified.

Diagnosis

It is diagnosed based on tissue, e.g. a biopsy, showing ductal hyperplasia.

There is no single definite cutoff that separates atypical ductal hyperplasia from ductal carcinoma in situ, but the following are important distinctive features of atypical ductal hyperplasia, with suggested cutoffs:
Size less than 2 mm.
Not involving more than one duct.
The atypical epithelial proliferation is admixed with a second population of proliferative cells without atypia.
The proliferation completely involves the terminal ductal lobular unit(s), to a limited extent.

Treatment
ADH, if found on a surgical (excisional) biopsy of a mammographic abnormality, does not require any further treatment, only mammographic follow-up.

If ADH is found on a core (needle) biopsy (a procedure which generally does not excise a suspicious mammographic abnormality), a surgical biopsy, i.e. a breast lumpectomy, to completely excise the abnormality and exclude breast cancer is the typical recommendation.

Prognosis

Cancer risk for ADH on a core biopsy
The rate at which breast cancer (ductal carcinoma in situ or invasive mammary carcinoma (all breast cancer except DCIS and LCIS)) is found at the time of a surgical (excisional) biopsy, following the diagnosis of ADH on a core (needle) biopsy varies considerably from hospital-to-hospital (range 4-54%).  In two large studies, the conversion of an ADH on core biopsy to breast cancer on surgical excision, known as "up-grading", is approximately 30%.

Cancer risk based on follow-up
The relative risk of breast cancer based on a median follow-up of 8 years, in a case control study of US registered nurses, is 3.7.

See also
Ductal carcinoma in situ
Breast cancer
Collagenous spherulosis

References

External links 

What is atypical ductal hyperplasia? (hopkinsmedicine.org)

Benign neoplasms
Breast neoplasia